Lasserre is a commune in the Lot-et-Garonne department in south-western France.

List of mayors 
Between 2003 and 2008, Gilbert Giraldello, a storekeeper, was the mayor.
Serge Pérès, a farmer, is currently the mayor, since 2008, and re-elected in 2014 and 2020.

See also
Communes of the Lot-et-Garonne department

References

Communes of Lot-et-Garonne